David Hoare was an English cricketer.

David Hoare may also refer to:

 Sir David Hoare, 9th Baronet (born 1935), British banker
David Hoare, former chairman of Ofsted
David Hoare, co-founder of Infinite Monkeys